Tor Jevne (21 November 1928 – 24 May 2001) was a Norwegian footballer. He played in three matches for the Norway national football team from 1952 to 1953. He was also part of Norway's squad for the 1952 Summer Olympics, but he did not play in any matches.

References

External links
 
 

1928 births
2001 deaths
Norwegian footballers
Norway international footballers
Place of birth missing
Association football forwards
Skeid Fotball players